The 2009–10 Odense Boldklub season was the club's 122nd season, and their 49th appearance in the Danish Superliga. As well as the Superliga, they competed in the Ekstra Bladet Cup.

First team 

Last updated on 31 May 2010

Transfers and loans

Transfers in

Competitions

Superliga

Results summary

Result by round

Matches

References 

Odense Boldklub seasons